The 2014–15 Los Angeles Clippers season is the 45th season of the franchise in the National Basketball Association (NBA), their 37th season in Southern California, and their 31st season in Los Angeles. Former Microsoft CEO Steve Ballmer became the new owner of Clippers. The team finished 56-26 on the season, only one game fewer than the previous season, clinching the 3rd seed for the NBA Playoffs.

In the playoffs, the Clippers faced the defending NBA champion San Antonio Spurs in the First Round, winning in seven games after Chris Paul hit a game winning layup with 1 second on the clock and Matt Barnes blocked a desperate final inbound pass by the Spurs as time expired to seal the victory and the series, winning Game 7 111–109. The Clippers' season ended with a Game 7 loss in the semifinals after leading the series 3–1 over the Houston Rockets, missing out on what could have been the Clippers' first Western Conference Finals appearance in franchise history. The Rockets would go on to lose the Western Conference Finals to the eventual champion Golden State Warriors in 5 games.

Key dates
 June 26, 2014: The 2014 NBA draft took place at Barclays Center in Brooklyn, New York.
 August 12, 2014: Former Microsoft executive Steve Ballmer completes the purchase of the Clippers franchise from the Sterling family trust, for $2 billion.

Draft picks

Roster

Roster notes
 Guard Jordan Farmar, who had previously played on the Los Angeles Lakers, becomes the 24th player overall to also play for the cross-town rivals, the Clippers.  Besides both being based in Los Angeles, the two teams have also played at the Staples Center since 1999.  Farmar would later be waived after playing in 36 games.
 Assistant coaches Mike Woodson and Sam Cassell previously played for the Clippers franchise. Woodson was on the team from 1986 to 1988, while Cassell played from 2005 to 2008.
 Coach Doc Rivers becomes the first person to coach his son Austin Rivers on an NBA team.

Preseason

|- style="background:#fcc;"
| 1
| October 7
| Golden State
| 
| Blake Griffin (24)
| Griffin (12)
| Chris Paul (9)
| Staples Center13,958
| 0–1
|- style="background:#fcc;"
| 2
| October 12
| @ Portland
| 
| Jamal Crawford (23)
| DeAndre Jordan (8)
| Jordan Farmar (7)
| Moda Center17,784
| 0-2
|- style="background:#fcc;"
| 3
| October 13
| @ Utah
| 
| Griffin (31)
| Jordan (8)
| Paul (11)
| EnergySolutions Arena19,319
| 0-3
|- style="background:#cfc;"
| 4
| October 17
| Utah
| 
| Jamal Crawford (25)
| Jordan (17)
| Paul (9)
| Staples Center13,714
| 1-3
|- style="background:#fcc;"
| 5
| October 18
| Denver
| 
| Griffin (27)
| Jordan (12)
| Paul (9)
| Mandalay Bay Events Center (Las Vegas)8,331
| 1–4
|- style="background:#fcc;"
| 6
| October 21
| @ Golden State
| 
| Jared Cunningham (23)
| Jordan (9)
| Jordan (5)
| Oracle Arena19,596
| 1–5
|- style="background:#cfc;"
| 7
| October 22
| Phoenix
| 
| Griffin (35)
| Spencer Hawes (10)
| Paul (9)
| Staples Center13,477
| 2–5
|- style="background:#fcc;"
| 8
| October 24
| Portland
| 
| Griffin (21)
| Jordan (9)
| Paul (11)
| Staples Center15,069
| 2–6

Regular season

Standings

Game log

Summer League

Regular season

|- style="background:#cfc;"
| 1
| October 30
| Oklahoma City
| 
| Blake Griffin (23)
| DeAndre Jordan (10)
| Chris Paul (7)
| Staples Center19,060
| 1–0
|- style="background:#cfc;"
| 2
| October 31
| @ L.A. Lakers
| 
| Blake Griffin (39)
| DeAndre Jordan (13)
| Chris Paul (10)
| Staples Center(18,997
| 2–0
|-

|- style="background:#fcc;"
| 3
| November 2
| Sacramento
| 
| Blake Griffin (17)
| DeAndre Jordan (9)
| Chris Paul (11)
| Staples Center19,060
| 2–1
|- style="background:#cfc;"
| 4
| November 3
| Utah
| 
| Blake Griffin (31)
| Chris Paul (10)
| Chris Paul (12)
| Staples Center19,060
| 3–1
|- style="background:#fcc;"
| 5
| November 5
| @ Golden State
| 
| Jamal Crawford (24)
| DeAndre Jordan (13)
| Chris Paul (12)
| Oracle Arena19,596
| 3–2
|- style="background:#cfc;"
| 6
| November 8
| Portland
| 
| JJ Redick (30)
| DeAndre Jordan (14)
| Chris Paul (11)
| Staples Center19,060
| 4–2
|- style="background:#fcc;"
| 7
| November 10
| San Antonio
| 
| Blake Griffin (23)
| DeAndre Jordan (13)
| Chris Paul (9)
| Staples Center19,313
| 4–3
|- style="background:#cfc;"
| 8
| November 15
| Phoenix
| 
| Chris Paul (32)
| DeAndre Jordan (18)
| Chris Paul (9)
| Staples Center19,060
| 5–3
|- style="background:#fcc;"
| 9
| November 17
| Chicago
| 
| Jamal Crawford (24)
| DeAndre Jordan (17)
| Chris Paul (7)
| Staples Center19,319
| 5–4
|- style="background:#cfc;"
| 10
| November 19
| @ Orlando
| 
| Jamal Crawford (22)
| DeAndre Jordan (11)
| Chris Paul (9)
| Amway Center16,034
| 6–4
|- style="background:#cfc;"
| 11
| November 20
| @ Miami
| 
| Blake Griffin & Chris Paul (26 each)
| DeAndre Jordan (11)
| Chris Paul (12)
| American Airlines Arena19,685
| 7–4
|- style="background:#fcc;"
| 12
| November 23
| @ Memphis
| 
| Chris Paul (22)
| Spencer Hawes (10)
| Chris Paul (5)
| FedExForum18,119
| 7–5
|- style="background:#cfc;"
| 13
| November 24
| @ Charlotte
| 
| Blake Griffin & Chris Paul (22)
| Blake Griffin (16)
| Chris Paul (15)
| Time Warner Cable Arena17,180
| 8–5
|- style="background:#cfc;"
| 14
| November 26
| @ Detroit
| 
| Jamal Crawford (25)
| DeAndre Jordan (11)
| Blake Griffin & Chris Paul (7)
| The Palace of Auburn Hills13,461
| 9–5
|- style="background:#cfc;"
| 15
| November 28
| @ Houston
| 
| Blake Griffin (30)
| DeAndre Jordan (13)
| Chris Paul (7)
| Toyota Center18,226
| 10–5
|- style="background:#cfc;"
| 16
| November 29
| @ Utah
| 
| Blake Griffin (28)
| DeAndre Jordan (12)
| Chris Paul (10)
| EnergySolutions Arena18,479
| 11–5
|-

|-style="background:#cfc;"
| 17
| December 1
| Minnesota
| 
| Blake Griffin & JJ Redick (23)
| DeAndre Jordan (13)
| Chris Paul (8)
| Staples Center19,060
| 12–5
|-style="background:#cfc;"
| 18
| December 3
| Orlando
| 
| Blake Griffin (21)
| DeAndre Jordan (16)
| Chris Paul (10)
| Staples Center19,060
| 13–5
|-style="background:#cfc;"
| 19
| December 6
| New Orleans
| 
| Blake Griffin (30)
| DeAndre Jordan (18)
| Chris Paul (16)
| Staples Center19,060
| 14–5
|-style="background:#cfc;"
| 20
| December 8
| Phoenix
| 
| Blake Griffin (45)
| DeAndre Jordan (14)
| Chris Paul (10)
| Staples Center19,060
| 15–5
|-style="background:#cfc;"
| 21
| December 10
| @ Indiana
| 
| Jamal Crawford (18)
| DeAndre Jordan (19)
| Chris Paul (15)
| Bankers Life Fieldhouse16,392
| 16–5
|-style="background:#fcc;"
| 22
| December 12
| @ Washington
| 
| Chris Paul (19)
| DeAndre Jordan (8)
| Chris Paul (6)
| Verizon Center17,437
| 16–6
|-style="background:#fcc;"
| 23
| December 13
| @ Milwaukee
| 
| Matt Barnes (26)
| DeAndre Jordan (15)
| Blake Griffin (9)
| BMO Harris Bradley Center16,227
| 16–7
|-style="background:#cfc;"
| 24
| December 15
| Detroit
| 
| Blake Griffin (18)
| DeAndre Jordan (15)
| Chris Paul (8)
| Staples Center19,060
| 17–7
|-style="background:#cfc;"
| 25
| December 17
| Indiana
| 
| Blake Griffin (31)
| DeAndre Jordan (23)
| Chris Paul (9)
| Staples Center19,060
| 18–7
|-style="background:#fcc;"
| 26
| December 19
| @ Denver
| 
| Blake Griffin (32)
| DeAndre Jordan (14)
| Chris Paul (15)
| Pepsi Center15,030
| 18–8
|-style="background:#cfc;"
| 27
| December 20
| Milwaukee
| 
| Chris Paul (27)
| DeAndre Jordan (16)
| Chris Paul (9)
| Staples Center19,060
| 19–8
|-style="background:#fcc;"
| 28
| December 22
| @ San Antonio
| 
| Chris Paul (25)
| DeAndre Jordan (11)
| Chris Paul (9)
| AT&T Center18,581
| 19–9
|-style="background:#fcc;"
| 29
| December 23
| @ Atlanta
| 
| Blake Griffin (21)
| DeAndre Jordan (22)
| Blake Griffin (11)
| Philips Arena19,191
| 19–10
|-style="background:#cfc;"
| 30
| December 25
| Golden State
| 
| Jamal Crawford (24)
| Blake Griffin (15)
| Blake Griffin (6)
| Staples Center19,540
| 20–10
|-style="background:#fcc;"
| 31
| December 27
| Toronto
| 
| JJ Redick (23)
| DeAndre Jordan (20)
| Chris Paul (8)
| Staples Center19,335
| 20–11
|-style="background:#cfc;"
| 32
| December 29
| Utah
| 
| Blake Griffin (24)
| DeAndre Jordan (19)
| Chris Paul (8)
| Staples Center19,060
| 21–11
|-style="background:#cfc;"
| 33
| December 31
| New York
| 
| JJ Redick (20)
| DeAndre Jordan (12)
| Blake Griffin (11)
| Staples Center19,198
| 22–11
|-

|-style="background:#cfc;"
| 34
| January 3
| Philadelphia
| 
| Chris Paul (24)
| DeAndre Jordan (10)
| Chris Paul (12)
| Staples Center19,060
| 23–11
|-style="background:#fcc;"
| 35
| January 5
| Atlanta
| 
| Blake Griffin (26)
| DeAndre Jordan (16)
| Chris Paul (10)
| Staples Center19,060
| 23–12
|-style="background:#cfc;"
| 36
| January 7
| L.A. Lakers
| 
| Blake Griffin (27)
| DeAndre Jordan (13)
| Chris Paul (11)
| Staples Center19,487
| 24–12
|-style="background:#cfc;"
| 37
| January 10
| Dallas
| 
| Blake Griffin (22)
| DeAndre Jordan (15)
| Chris Paul (13)
| Staples Center19,060
| 25–12
|-style="background:#fcc;"
| 38
| January 11
| Miami
| 
| Blake Griffin (26)
| Blake Griffin & DeAndre Jordan (6 each)
| Chris Paul (9)
| Staples Center19,060
| 25–13
|-style="background:#cfc;"
| 39
| January 14
| @ Portland
| 
| Jamal Crawford (25)
| DeAndre Jordan (18)
| Chris Paul (9)
| Moda Center19,441
| 26–13
|-style="background:#fcc;"
| 40
| January 16
| Cleveland
| 
| Blake Griffin (34)
| DeAndre Jordan (12)
| Chris Paul (14)
| Staples Center19,380
| 26–14
|-style="background:#cfc;"
| 41
| January 17
| @ Sacramento
| 
| Blake Griffin (34)
| Matt Barnes (10)
| Chris Paul (9)
| Sleep Train Arena16,601
| 27–14
|-style="background:#cfc;"
| 42
| January 19
| Boston
| 
| Blake Griffin (22)
| DeAndre Jordan (12)
| Blake Griffin & Chris Paul (6 each)
| Staples Center19,060
| 28–14
|-style="background:#cfc;"
| 43
| January 22
| Brooklyn
| 
| Blake Griffin (24)
| DeAndre Jordan (12)
| Chris Paul (17)
| Staples Center19,060
| 29–14
|-style="background:#cfc;"
| 44
| January 25
| @ Phoenix
| 
| Blake Griffin & Chris Paul (23 each)
| DeAndre Jordan (14)
| Chris Paul (12)
| US Airways Center17,066
| 30–14
|-style="background:#cfc;"
| 45
| January 26
| Denver
| 
| Jamal Crawford (23)
| DeAndre Jordan (12)
| Blake Griffin (10)
| Staples Center19,060
| 31–14
|-style="background:#cfc;"
| 46
| January 28
| @ Utah
| 
| Jamal Crawford & Chris Paul (21 each)
| DeAndre Jordan (12)
| Chris Paul (6)
| EnergySolutions Arena16,322
| 32–14
|-style="background:#fcc;"
| 47
| January 30
| @ New Orleans
| 
| Chris Paul (24)
| DeAndre Jordan (15)
| Chris Paul (7)
| Smoothie King Center17,932
| 32–15
|-style="background:#cfc;"
| 48
| January 31
| @ San Antonio
| 
| Blake Griffin (31)
| DeAndre Jordan (19)
| Chris Paul (6)
| AT&T Center18,581
| 33–15
|-

|-style="background:#fcc;"
| 49
| February 2
| @ Brooklyn
| 
| DeAndre Jordan (22)
| DeAndre Jordan (20)
| Chris Paul (8)
| Barclays Center16,037
| 33–16
|-style="background:#fcc;"
| 50
| February 5
| @ Cleveland
| 
| Blake Griffin (16)
| DeAndre Jordan (14)
| Chris Paul (9)
| Quicken Loans Arena20,562
| 33–17
|-style="background:#fcc;"
| 51
| February 6
| @ Toronto
| 
| Blake Griffin (26)
| Matt Barnes & DeAndre Jordan (7 each)
| Chris Paul & DeAndre Jordan (9 each)
| Air Canada Centre19,800
| 33–18
|-style="background:#fcc;"
| 52
| February 8
| @ Oklahoma City
| 
| Jamal Crawford (21)
| DeAndre Jordan (10)
| Chris Paul (13)
| Chesapeake Energy Arena18,203
| 33–19
|-style="background:#cfc;"
| 53
| February 9
| @ Dallas
| 
| Chris Paul (25)
| DeAndre Jordan (27)
| Chris Paul (13)
| American Airlines Center20,082
| 34–19
|-style="background:#cfc;"
| 54
| February 11
| Houston
| 
| DeAndre Jordan (24)
| DeAndre Jordan (20)
| Chris Paul (12)
| Staples Center19,060
| 35–19
|- align="center"
|colspan="9" bgcolor="#bbcaff"|All-Star Break
|- style="background:#cfc;"
| 55
| February 19
| San Antonio
| 
| DeAndre Jordan & Jamal Crawford (26)
| DeAndre Jordan (20)
| Chris Paul (12)
| Staples Center19,358
| 36–19
|- style="background:#cfc;"
| 56
| February 21
| Sacramento
| 
| Austin Rivers (28)
| DeAndre Jordan (15)
| Chris Paul (9)
| Staples Center19,133
| 37–19
|- style="background:#fcc;"
| 57
| February 23
| Memphis
| 
| Chris Paul (30)
| DeAndre Jordan (17)
| Chris Paul (10)
| Staples Center19,161
| 37–20
|- style="background:#fcc;"
| 58
| February 25
| @ Houston
| 
| Jamal Crawford (24)
| DeAndre Jordan (22)
| Chris Paul (13)
| Toyota Center18,154
| 37–21
|- style="background:#cfc;"
| 59
| February 27
| @ Memphis
| 
| Chris Paul & Jamal Crawford (19)
| DeAndre Jordan (19)
| Chris Paul (14)
| FedExForum18,119
| 38–21
|-

|- style="background:#cfc;"
| 60
| March 1
| @ Chicago
| 
| Chris Paul (28)
| DeAndre Jordan (26)
| Chris Paul (12)
| United Center21,680
| 39–21
|- style="background:#cfc;"
| 61
| March 2
| @ Minnesota
| 
| Chris Paul (26)
| DeAndre Jordan (18)
| Chris Paul (14)
| Target Center18,239
| 40–21
|- style="background:#fcc;"
| 62
| March 4
| Portland
| 
| Chris Paul (36)
| DeAndre Jordan (19)
| Chris Paul (12)
| Staples Center19,060
| 40–22
|- style="background:#fcc;"
| 63
| March 8
| @ Golden State
| 
| Austin Rivers (22)
| DeAndre Jordan (14)
| Chris Paul (11)
| Oracle Arena19,596
| 40–23
|- style="background:#cfc;"
| 64
| March 9
| Minnesota
| 
| DeAndre Jordan (20)
| DeAndre Jordan (17)
| Chris Paul (11)
| Staples Center19,060
| 41–23
|- style="background:#cfc;"
| 65
| March 11
| @ Oklahoma City
| 
| Chris Paul (33)
| DeAndre Jordan (17)
| Chris Paul (9)
| Chesapeake Energy Arena18,203
| 42–23
|- style="background:#fcc;"
| 66
| March 13
| @ Dallas
| 
| JJ Redick (17)
| DeAndre Jordan (8)
| Chris Paul (7)
| American Airlines Center20,444
| 42–24
|- style="background:#fcc;"
| 67
| March 15
| Houston
| 
| Chris Paul (23)
| DeAndre Jordan (20)
| Blake Griffin (8)
| Staples Center19,211
| 42–25
|- style="background:#cfc;"
| 68
| March 17
| Charlotte
| 
| JJ Redick (23)
| DeAndre Jordan (14)
| Chris Paul (8)
| Staples Center19,060
| 43–25
|- style="background:#cfc;"
| 69
| March 18
| @ Sacramento
| 
| Chris Paul (30)
| DeAndre Jordan (15)
| Chris Paul (11)
| Sleep Train Arena16,785
| 44–25
|- style="background:#cfc;"
| 70
| March 20
| Washington
| 
| Chris Paul (30)
| DeAndre Jordan (23)
| Chris Paul (15)
| Staples Center19,218
| 45–25
|- style="background:#cfc;"
| 71
| March 22
| New Orleans
| 
| Chris Paul & Blake Griffin (23)
| DeAndre Jordan (16)
| Chris Paul (11)
| Staples Center19,299
| 46–25
|- style="background:#cfc;"
| 72
| March 25
| @ New York
| 
| Austin Rivers (21)
| DeAndre Jordan (10)
| Chris Paul (16)
| Madison Square Garden19,812
| 47–25
|- style="background:#cfc;"
| 73
| March 27
| @ Philadelphia
| 
| Chris Paul (25)
| DeAndre Jordan (20)
| Chris Paul (7)
| Wells Fargo Center16,070
| 48–25
|- style="background:#cfc;"
| 74
| March 29
| @ Boston
| 
| JJ Redick (27)
| DeAndre Jordan (14)
| Chris Paul (10)
| TD Garden18,624
| 49–25
|- style="background:#fcc;"
| 75
| March 31
| Golden State
| 
| Blake Griffin (40)
| Blake Griffin (12)
| Chris Paul (9)
| Staples Center19,601
| 49–26
|-

|- style="background:#cfc;"
| 76
| April 1
| @ Portland
| 
| Chris Paul (41)
| DeAndre Jordan (13)
| Chris Paul (17)
| Moda Center19,639
| 50–26
|- style="background:#cfc;"
| 77
| April 4
| @ Denver
| 
| JJ Redick (25)
| DeAndre Jordan (22)
| Chris Paul (9)
| Pepsi Center15,566
| 51–26
|- style="background:#cfc;"
| 78
| April 5
| @ L.A. Lakers
| 
| Blake Griffin (18)
| DeAndre Jordan (11)
| Chris Paul (15)
| Staples Center18,997
| 52–26
|- style="background:#cfc;"
| 79
| April 7
| L.A. Lakers
| 
| Blake Griffin & JJ Redick (27)
| DeAndre Jordan (17)
| Chris Paul (10)
| Staples Center19,438
| 53–26
|- style="background:#cfc;"
| 80
| April 11
| Memphis
| 
| Blake Griffin & JJ Redick (18)
| DeAndre Jordan (16)
| Chris Paul (14)
| Staples Center19,401
| 54–26
|- style="background:#cfc;"
| 81
| April 13
| Denver
| 
| DeAndre Jordan & JJ Redick (20)
| DeAndre Jordan (21)
| Chris Paul (9)
| Staples Center19,060
| 55–26
|- style="background:#cfc;"
| 82
| April 14
| @ Phoenix
| 
| Chris Paul (22)
| DeAndre Jordan (14)
| Chris Paul (6)
| US Airways Center18,055
| 56–26

Playoffs

|- style="background:#bfb;"
| 1
| April 19
| San Antonio
| 
| Chris Paul (32)
| DeAndre Jordan (14)
| Griffin & Paul (6)
| Staples Center19,309
| 1–0
|- style="background:#fbb;"
| 2
| April 22
| San Antonio
| 
| Blake Griffin (29)
| DeAndre Jordan (15)
| Blake Griffin (11)
| Staples Center19,482
| 1–1
|- style="background:#fbb;"
| 3
| April 24
| @ San Antonio
| 
| Blake Griffin (14)
| Blake Griffin (10)
| Blake Griffin (6)
| AT&T Center18,581
| 1–2
|- style="background:#bfb;"
| 4
| April 26
| @ San Antonio
| 
| Chris Paul (34)
| Blake Griffin (17)
| Chris Paul (7)
| AT&T Center18,581
| 2–2
|- style="background:#fbb;"
| 5
| April 28
| San Antonio
| 
| Blake Griffin (30)
| Jordan, Griffin (14)
| Chris Paul (10)
| Staples Center19,571
| 2–3
|- style="background:#bfb;"
| 6
| April 30
| @ San Antonio
| 
| Blake Griffin (26)
| DeAndre Jordan (14)
| Chris Paul (15)
| AT&T Center18,581
| 3–3
|- style="background:#bfb;"
| 7
| May 2
| San Antonio
| 
| Chris Paul (27)
| DeAndre Jordan (14)
| Blake Griffin (10)
| Staples Center19,588
| 4–3

|-  style="background:#bfb;"
| 1
| May 4
| @ Houston
| 
| Blake Griffin (26)
| Blake Griffin (14)
| Blake Griffin (13)
| Toyota Center18,231
| 1–0
|- style="background:#fbb;"
| 2
| May 6
| @ Houston
| 
| Blake Griffin (34)
| Blake Griffin (15)
| Jamal Crawford (5)
| Toyota Center18,310
| 1–1
|- style="background:#bfb;"
| 3
| May 8
| Houston
| 
| JJ Redick (31)
| DeAndre Jordan (14)
| Chris Paul (7)
| Staples Center19,367
| 2–1
|- style="background:#bfb;"
| 4
| May 10
| Houston
| 
| DeAndre Jordan (26)
| DeAndre Jordan (17)
| Chris Paul (12)
| Staples Center19,490
| 3–1
|- style="background:#fbb;"
| 5
| May 12
| @ Houston
| 
| Blake Griffin (30)
| Blake Griffin (16)
| Chris Paul (10)
| Toyota Center18,142
| 3–2
|- style="background:#fbb;"
| 6
| May 14
| Houston
| 
| Chris Paul (31)
| Matt Barnes (10)
| Chris Paul (11)
| Staples Center19,417
| 3–3
|- style="background:#fbb;"
| 7
| May 17
| @ Houston
| 
| Blake Griffin (27)
| DeAndre Jordan (17)
| Chris Paul (10)
| Toyota Center18,463
| 3–4

Transactions

Trades

Free agents

Re-signed

Additions

Subtractions

References

External links
 2014–15 Los Angeles Clippers preseason at ESPN
 2014–15 Los Angeles Clippers regular season at ESPN

Los Angeles Clippers seasons
Los Angeles Clippers